Jerry Alberto Ortíz Cortés (born 7 November 1992) is a Colombian footballer who last played for Tauro.

Career
On 28 February 2018, Ortiz signed with USL side Penn FC. Prior to his move to the United States, Ortiz had played with Atlético, Cortuluá, Envigado, Atlético Huila and Once Caldas.

On 9 January 2019, Ortiz left Ararat-Armenia by mutual consent.

References

External links

1992 births
Living people
Colombian footballers
Colombian expatriate footballers
Categoría Primera B players
Categoría Primera A players
USL Championship players
Armenian Premier League players
Liga Panameña de Fútbol players
Atlético F.C. footballers
Cortuluá footballers
Envigado F.C. players
Atlético Huila footballers
Once Caldas footballers
Penn FC players
FC Ararat-Armenia players
Tauro F.C. players
Association football midfielders
Footballers from Cali
Colombian expatriate sportspeople in the United States
Colombian expatriate sportspeople in Panama
Expatriate soccer players in the United States
Expatriate footballers in Armenia
Expatriate footballers in Panama